Alan Rowe Kelly (born January 13, 1959) is an American independent film actor, director, writer and producer, specializing in horror films.

Biography
Kelly was born in Dover, New Jersey. After attending New York City art schools, Kelly commenced his career as an art director in the cosmetics field before becoming a makeup artist and hair stylist in Manhattan's fashion/advertising industry, working behind the camera for fashion magazines, catalogs, television commercials and infomercials. 
 
In 1999, Kelly began directing, producing and writing screenplays for horror movies, entering the independent horror scene with his award-winning debut film I'll Bury You Tomorrow (2002). In 2006, Kelly founded SouthPaw Pictures, a film production company based in Paterson, New Jersey. His other directing credits include Gallery of Fear (2013), The Blood Shed (2007) and Tales of Poe (2013). He portrays female characters in these and other films, such as Vindication (2006), Satan Hates You (2010) and Razor Days (2012).

Kelly has been a longtime resident of Wharton, New Jersey, and wrote a history of the borough together with his mother.

Filmography

Feature film
 I'll Bury You Tomorrow (2002) – Corey Nichols
 Opening The Mind – (2020) – Prostitute
 Dead Serious (2005) – Eden
 Splatter Movie: The Director's Cut (2007) – Devora Simmons
 The Blood Shed (2007) – Beefteena Bullion
 Ding Dong Date (2007) – Jul
 The Screening (2007)
 Eat Your Heart Out (2008) – Mama
 Pink Eye (2008) – Schlitze
 Vindication (2008) – Urbane
 Experiment 7 (2009) – Dr. Melanie Phillips
 Crossed (2009) – Ed
 Sculpture (2009) – William
 Slices of Life (2010) – Web Cam Vamp
 Satan Hates You (2010) – Cokey
 Kodie (2010) – The Witch
 She Wolf Rising (2010) – Tess
 River of Darkness (2011) – Mary Rutledge
 The Big Bad (2011) – Dr. Annabelle Voitch
 I Heart U (2012) – Rachel the Reporter
 Razor Days (2013) – Dr. Mortensen
 Gallery of Fear (2013) – Director, Lane
The Theatre of Terror (2020) - Mama
Midnight Devils (2019) Mordak, the witch
Tales of Poe (2014) - Gogo Montresor / Peggy Lamarr

Short film
 The Pod (2006) – Nancy Type 2
 Insatiable (2008) – Organ Player
 Contact (2009) – Rowan
 Something Just (2010) – Thomas Sutcliffe
 Psycho Street (2012) – Charity Betencourt ("Hypochondriac")
 Gallery of Fear (2012) – Lane ("A Far Cry from Home")

Bibliography
 Wharton (Arcadia Press) – Charlotte Kelly & Alan Rowe Kelly

Awards
 2002 Telluride Indiefest Best Horror Feature for I'll Bury You Tomorrow.
 2002 New York International Independent Film and Video Festival Best Horror Feature for I'll Bury You Tomorrow.
 2007 Dark Carnival Film Festival Best Feature for The Blood Shed.
 2009 Terror Film Festival Best Actor for A Far Cry from Home/Gallery of Fear.
 2009 Long Island Gay & Lesbian Film Festival Jury Award for Most Exciting New Filmmaker – A Far Cry from Home/Gallery of Fear.
 2010 Terror Film Festival Best Supporting Actor for Bart Mastronardi's Vindication.
 2010 Dark Carnival Film Festival Best Supporting Actor for Hypochondriac/Psycho Street.
 2012 Terror Film Festival Best Actor in Something Just.

Notes

References

External links
 

1959 births
Living people
American directors
Male actors from New Jersey
People from Dover, New Jersey
People from Morris County, New Jersey